Mackin Speaks Louder Than Words is the 6th studio album by Mac Mall. It was released September 10, 2002.

Track listing
	

Mac Mall albums
2002 albums